The Front of Hope (Frente de Esperanza) is a political party in Colombia. 
At the last legislative elections, 10 March 2002, the party won as one of the many small parties parliamentary representation. 

Political parties in Colombia